Jones County is a county in the U.S. state of Iowa. As of the 2020 census the population was 20,646. The county seat is Anamosa. The county was founded in 1837 and named after George Wallace Jones, a United States senator and member of Congress.

Jones County is included in the Cedar Rapids Metropolitan Statistical Area.

Geography

Major highways
 U.S. Highway 151
 Iowa Highway 1
 Iowa Highway 38
 Iowa Highway 64
 Iowa Highway 136

Airport
Monticello Regional Airport (MXO) serves the county and surrounding communities.

Adjacent counties
Delaware County  (northwest)
Dubuque County  (northeast)
Jackson County  (east)
Clinton County  (southeast)
Cedar County  (south)
Linn County  (west)

Parks
Wapsipinicon State Park - Anamosa
Central Park
Pictured Rocks County Park
Wapsipinicon State Park – This 400-acre park includes hiking, climbing, nature study, fishing in the Wapsipinicon River, modern camping, picnicking and golf. The park is covered with vegetation and trees, and hik¬ing reveals a multitude of flowers and wildlife. A road makes a complete circle of the park, winding between the river and bluffs, where the view is great. Included along the drive is a trip through the oldest plant¬ing of white pine in Iowa. There are also several caves such as Horse Thief Cave and Ice Cave. The Wapsi has long been famous for its channel and flathead catfish, as well as spring crappies and bullheads, especially below the dam at the park's entrance. Bass, walleye and northern also inhabit the waters. Of the 30 campsites, 15 have electricity. Running water and hot showers are available for modern camping, and mushroom hunting is allowed. Wapsipinicon Country Club maintains a nine-hole golf course in the park. The park has two lodges – one heated and one for summer use – that are available upon reservation with the park ranger. For more information, call 319-462-2761. For information about golfing, call the Wapsipinicon Country Club at 319-462-3930.
Central Park: This 217-acre park is located four miles southeast of Amber off County Roads X44 and E29 and Central Park Road. Campsites and the park's 25-acre lake are the main draws to Central Park. Campsites range from primitive to full hook-up. Central Parks other amenities include a swimming beach, sand volleyball area, horseshoe pits, playground, boat ramp, hiking trails, rental pavilions, handicapped-accessible fishing pier, picnic areas, rental cabins and a nature center. The Central Park Nature Center is open 1-5 p.m. Saturdays and Sundays, Memorial Day through Labor Day weekend.
Pictured Rocks Park – Located south of Monticello off Highway 38, this park offers  hiking, climbing and access to the Maquoketa River. Picnic shelters, restrooms, playground equipment, and a boat ramp are available. 
Whitewater Canyon – Known for its beauty, the Whitewater Canyon area totals 562 acres of timber, restored prairie, and riverine habitat. Public hunting and fishing are allowed, and mowed hiking trails provide year-round recreational opportunities. This area is located east of Cascade on Highway 151, and south on Curoe Road.
Mon-Maq Dam – Located one mile northeast of Monticello along the Maquoketa River, this river access includes 63 acres of riverine habitat. Known for its fishing holes, the Mon-Maq Dam area provides fishing fun for local anglers. Sandy areas downstream from the dam serve as put-in sites for canoeists and kayakers.

Demographics

2020 census
There were 8,871 housing units, of which 8,113 were occupied.

2010 census
There were 8,911 housing units, of which 8,151 were occupied.

2000 census

As of the census of 2000, there were 20,221 people, 7,560 households, and 5,299 families residing in the county. There were 8,126 housing units at an average density of 14 per square mile (5/km2). The racial makeup of the county was 96.68% White, 1.79% Black or African American, 0.32% Native American, 0.22% Asian, 0.23% from other races, and 0.78% from two or more races.  1.05% of the population were Hispanic or Latino of any race.

There were 7,560 households, out of which 31.00% had children under the age of 18 living with them, 59.00% were married couples living together, 7.90% had a female householder with no husband present, and 29.90% were non-families. 25.30% of all households were made up of individuals, and 12.50% had someone living alone who was 65 years of age or older.  The average household size was 2.47 and the average family size was 2.95.

In the county, the population was spread out, with 24.10% under the age of 18, 7.90% from 18 to 24, 29.00% from 25 to 44, 23.30% from 45 to 64, and 15.80% who were 65 years of age or older.  The median age was 38 years. For every 100 females, there were 109.30 males.  For every 100 females age 18 and over, there were 111.60 males.

The median income for a household in the county was $37,449, and the median income for a family was $44,269. Males had a median income of $31,039 versus $22,075 for females. The per capita income for the county was $17,816.  About 6.20% of families and 8.60% of the population were below the poverty line, including 8.80% of those under age 18 and 10.20% of those age 65 or over.

Communities

Cities

Anamosa
Cascade
Martelle
Monticello
Morley
Olin
Onslow
Oxford Junction
Wyoming

Census-designated places
Center Junction
Stone City

Other unincorporated communities
Canton (partial)
Center Junction
Fairview
Langworthy
Oxford Mills

Townships

Cass
Castle Grove
Clay
Fairview
Greenfield
Hale
Jackson
Lovell
Madison
Monticello
Oxford
Richland
Rome
Scotch Grove
Washington
Wayne
Wyoming

Population ranking
The population ranking of the following table is based on the 2020 census of Jones County.

† county seat

Politics

See also

National Register of Historic Places listings in Jones County, Iowa

References

Further reading
 History of Jones County, Iowa, past and present - Vol 1; R.M. Corbit; S. J. Clarke Publishing; 1910 (update of 1871 issue).
 History of Jones County, Iowa, past and present - Vol 2; R.M. Corbit; S. J. Clarke Publishing; 1871.

External links

Jones County government's website
Jones County Genealogy Iowa GenWeb website

 
1837 establishments in Wisconsin Territory
Populated places established in 1837
Cedar Rapids, Iowa metropolitan area